Blue slip or blue-slipping refers to two distinct legislative procedures in the United States Congress.

In the House of Representatives, it is the rejection slip given to tax and spending bills sent to it by the Senate that did not originate in the House, according to the House's interpretation of the Origination Clause of the Constitution of the United States.

In the Senate, it is the slip on which the Senators from the state of residence of a federal judicial nominee give an opinion on the nominee.

House of Representatives
The Origination Clause of the United States Constitution (Article I, Section 7, Clause 1) provides that the House of Representatives has exclusive authority to introduce bills raising revenue: "All bills for raising Revenue shall originate in the House of Representatives." As such, the House considers itself to be the only proper venue to originate any bills appropriating revenue.

When, in the opinion of the House of Representatives, a Senate-introduced bill that raises revenue or appropriates money is passed by the Senate and sent to the House for its consideration, the House places a blue slip on the legislation that notes the House's constitutional prerogative and returns it to the Senate without taking further action. This blue-slipping procedure, done by an order of the House, is routinely completed to enforce its interpretation that the House is the sole body to introduce revenue or appropriations legislation. The failure of the House to consider the legislation means it cannot become a law. This tactic is historically of great use to the House and, as a practical matter, the Senate does not introduce tax or revenue measures in order to avoid a blue slip.

The Senate can circumvent this requirement by substituting the text of any bill previously passed by the House with the text of a revenue bill.

Senate
In the Senate, a blue slip is an opinion written by a Senator from the state where a federal judicial nominee resides. Both senators from a nominee's state are sent a blue slip in which they may submit a favorable or unfavorable opinion of a nominee. They may also choose not to return a blue slip. The Senate Judiciary Committee takes blue slips into consideration when deciding whether or not to recommend that the Senate confirm a nominee.

A report issued by the Congressional Research Service in 2003 defines six periods in the use of the blue slip by the Senate:

From 1917 through 1955: The blue-slip policy allowed home-state Senators to state their objections but committee action to move forward on a nomination. If a Senator objected to his/her home-state nominee, the committee would report the nominee adversely to the Senate, where the contesting Senator would have the option of stating his/her objections to the nominee before the Senate would vote on confirmation.
From 1956 through 1978: A single home-state Senator could stop all committee action on a judicial nominee by either returning a negative blue slip or failing to return a blue slip to the committee. The originated when segregationist Senator James Eastland of Mississippi allowed nominations to be killed to prevent school integration.
From 1979 to mid-1989: A home-state Senator's failure to return a blue slip would not necessarily prevent committee action on a nominee.
From mid-1989 through June 5, 2001: In a public letter (1989) on the committee's blue-slip policy, the chairman wrote that one negative blue slip would be "a significant factor to be weighed" but would "not preclude consideration" of a nominee "unless the Administration has not consulted with both home state Senators." The committee would take no action, regardless of presidential consultation, if both home-state Senators returned negative blue slips.
From June 6, 2001, to 2003: The chairman's blue-slip policy allowed movement on a judicial nominee only if both home-state Senators returned positive blue slips to the committee. If one home-state Senator returned a negative blue slip, no further action would be taken on the nominee.
2003: A return of a negative blue slip by one or both home-state Senators does not prevent the committee from moving forward with the nomination — provided that the Administration has engaged in pre-nomination consultation with both of the home-state Senators.

Since 2003, blue slip policy has changed several more times, as follows:

2003 to 2007: A return of a negative blue slip by one or both home-state Senators does not prevent the committee from moving forward with the nomination — provided that the Administration has engaged in pre-nomination consultation with both of the home-state Senators.
2007 to January 3, 2018: The chairman's blue-slip policy allowed movement on a judicial nominee only if both home-state Senators returned positive blue slips to the committee. If one home-state Senator returned a negative blue slip, no further action would be taken on the nominee.
January 3, 2018, to present: The lack of two positive blue slips will not necessarily preclude a circuit-court nominee from receiving a hearing unless the White House failed to consult with home-state senators. Hearings are unlikely for district court nominees without two positive blue slips.

In October 2017, Senate Majority Leader Mitch McConnell announced that he believed blue slips should not prevent committee action on a nominee. In November 2017, the Chairman of the Senate Judiciary Committee, Chuck Grassley, announced that the committee would hold hearings for David Stras and Kyle Duncan. Stras's hearing was held up by Senator Al Franken's refusal to return his blue slip, while Duncan's hearing was held up by Senator John Neely Kennedy's indecision on his blue slip. Kennedy, however, consented to Duncan receiving a hearing.

In February 2019, attorney Eric Miller was confirmed to serve on the Ninth Circuit Court of Appeals, despite the fact that neither of his two home-state senators (Patty Murray and Maria Cantwell, both of Washington) had returned blue slips for him. He was the first federal judicial nominee to be confirmed without support from either of his home-state senators, although other nominees were similarly confirmed to the Courts of Appeals without blue slips later in 2019, including Paul Matey (Third Circuit, New Jersey), Joseph F. Bianco and Michael H. Park (both Second Circuit, New York), and Kenneth K. Lee, Daniel P. Collins, and Daniel Bress (all Ninth Circuit, California).

See also
Senatorial courtesy
Senate hold

References

External links
 

Terminology of the United States Congress
Parliamentary procedure